Desiree Glaubitz (born 24 September 1979 in Traralgon) is an Australian basketball player, captain of the Bulleen Boomers in the Women's National Basketball League.

Desi is 177 centimetres tall and plays guard.  In the WNBL, she has played with AIS 1997–99; Sydney 1999/00; Townsville 2001/02; Bulleen Boomers 2003/04 - Present .

External links                         
Player biography - WNBL official

Living people
1979 births
Australian women's basketball players
Melbourne Boomers players
Australian Institute of Sport basketball (WNBL) players
Sydney Uni Flames players
Townsville Fire players
People from Traralgon